Archbishop Makarios Griniezakis (Greek: Μακάριος Γρινιεζάκης; born 15 March 1973) is the current archbishop of the Greek Orthodox Church of Australia and the primate of the Greek Orthodox Archdiocese of Australia, succeeding Archbishop Stylianos of Australia.

Studies and career 
Prior to serving in the Greek Orthodox Church, Archbishop Makarios completed his elementary studies in his birthplace and at the Rizarios Ecclesiastical School of Athens. He is a graduate of the Higher Ecclesiastical School of Athens and of the Theological School of the National and Kapodistrian University of Athens. He completed postgraduate studies at the Universities of Boston (Master of Sacred Theology), Harvard University (Master of Arts), and Monash University, (Master of Bioethics), whilst his doctoral dissertation was received and passed as “Excellent” by the Medical School of the University of Crete. The work was published under the title, “Cloning: Social, Ethical and Theological Components”.

He became a monk and deacon in 1993, a presbyter in 1997 and an archimandrite in 1998 at the Holy Monastery of Saint George Epanosifi, whilst on Easter Sunday of 2008, Ecumenical Patriarch of Constantinople, Bartholomew I bestowed upon him the office of Archimandrite of the Ecumenical Throne.

Since 2003, Archbishop Makarios has been teaching at the Patriarchal Academy of Crete. In tandem, he has served as a visiting Professor to various universities, amongst which are the Theological College of Holy Cross in Boston, the University of Tartu and the Medical Schools of the Universities of Crete, Thessaly and Athens. In May 2015, he was elected the first Dean of the Department of Orthodox Studies of the Autonomous Church of Estonia.

Archbishop of Australia
On 9 May 2019, Archbishop Makarios was unanimously elected as the new archbishop of Australia, by the Holy Synod of the Ecumenical Patriarchate, succeeding Archbishop Stylianos of Australia, who died earlier that year (on March 25th).

On 18 June 2019, Archbishop Makarios arrived in Australia to be enthroned and begin his duties as the archbishop. On 29 June he was enthroned.

References 

1973 births
Living people
21st-century Eastern Orthodox archbishops
Eastern Orthodox archbishops in Australia
National and Kapodistrian University of Athens alumni
Boston University School of Theology alumni
Monash University alumni
Harvard University alumni
Clergy from Heraklion
Greek expatriate bishops